Randy Barceló (September 19, 1946 – December 6, 1994) was a Cuban dancer, photographer, interior designer, and all-around artist. He was also known for his set and costume designs for theatre and film.

Biography
Born in Havana on September 19, 1946, Randy Barceló left Cuba through Operation Pedro Pan at the age of 14. He studied art at University of Puerto Rico and in 1965 moved to New York where he enrolled in the Lester Polakov Studio and Forum of Stage Design.

Barceló began his career as a dancer and choreographer. At the age of 24, he worked as a designer for the Broadway musical, 'Lenny'. In 1972 he designed the costumes for Jesus Christ Superstar and was nominated for a Tony Award, the first Hispanic nominee for costume design. He went on to design costumes for several on- and off- Broadway plays and musicals, ballet and dance productions, and operas.

Barceló's art-work, primarily abstract and figurative sketches and paintings, have been shown in several galleries and museums including the Cooper Hewitt Museum, Hudson River Museum, and Kennedy Center for Performing Arts.

In 1994, Barceló designed costumes for ¡Si Señor! ¡Es Mi Son!, choreographed for Ballet Hispanico by Alberto Alonso and Sonia Calero with music by Gloria Estefan. These were his final designs as he died of cancer on December 6 of that same year.

Works or publications

Randy Barceló’s Production Credits

Broadway

 Ain't Misbehavin, 1978
 Ain't Misbehavin, 1988
 A Broadway Musical, 1978
 Dude 1972
 Jesus Christ Superstar, 1971
 Lenny, 1971
 The Leaf People, 1975 (costumes and make-up)
 The Magic Show, 1974
 Mayor, 1985 (sets and costumes)
 The Night That Made America Famous, 1975
 Senator Joe, 1989 (never officially opened)
 Sergeant Pepper's Lonely Hearts Club Band

Off-Broadway

 Blood Wedding, INTAR Theatre (sets and costumes)
 Caligula, La Mama Experimental Theatre Club
 Cracks, Theatre De Lys, 1976
 Lady Day, Chelsea Theatre Center
 Mayor, Village Gate Theatre (sets and costumes)
 A Midsummer Night's Dream, New York Shakespeare Festival, Delacorte Theatre, 1982
 The Moondreamers, La Mama Experimental Theatre Club
 Phillip Morris Superband Series, Beacon Theatre (set)
 Rice and Beans, INTAR Theatre (sets and costumes)
 Spookhouse, Playhouse 91, 1984
 The Tempest, LaMama Experimental Theatre Club

Opera

 L'Histoire du Soldat, Carnegie Hall (sets and costumes)
 Les Troyen, Vienna State Opera
 Lily, New York City Opera
 Mass, Leonard Bernstein, Kennedy Center
 Salome, New York City Opera

Ballet and Dance

 Black, Brown & Beige, Alvin Ailey Dance Theatre, 1976
 The Blues Ain't, Alvin Ailey Dance Theatre, 1974
 Crosswords, Alvin Ailey Dance Theatre
 La Dea delle Acque, Alvin Ailey for La Scala Opera Ballet, 1988
 For "Bird" – With Love, Alvin Ailey Dance Theatre, 1984
 Fuenteovejuna, Ballet Hispanico
 Lovers, Jennifer Muller (sets and costumes)
 Mondrian, Jennifer Muller (sets and costumes)
 The Mooche, Alvin Ailey Dance Theatre, 1974
 Opus McShann, Alvin Ailey Dance Theatre, 1988
 Predicaments for Five, Jennifer Muller (sets and costumes)
 ¡Si Señor! ¡Es Mi Son!, Ballet Hispanico, 1994
 Spell, Alvin Ailey Dance Theatre, 1981
 The Street Dancer, Ballet Hispanico,

Television

 Ailey Celebrates Ellington, Alvin Ailey for CBS, 1975
 Ain't Misbehavin, NBC, 1982
 Duke Ellington: The Music Lives On, PBS, 1983

Film

 Body Passion, 1987 (production designer)
 The Cop and the Anthem
 Cubanos (art direction and costumes)
 Fat Chance (set and costumes for theater sequence)
 Fatal Encounter, 1981
 Secret Life of Plants (costumes for dance sequence)
 Tainted, 1988 (art direction and costumes)
 Los Dos Mundos de Angelita, 1984 (art direction and costumes)
 Welcome to Miami (art direction and costumes)
 When the Mountains Tremble, 1983 (production designer)

Notes and references

External links

 The Randy Barceló collection is available at the Cuban Heritage Collection, University of Miami Libraries. The Randy Barceló collection consists primarily of oversize costume and set designs by the Cuban-born designer. The collection also includes costume plots, drawings and sketches, posters and postcards, videotapes, photographs and slides, and two scripts written by Barceló.
 Selected designs from the Randy Barceló collection are available through the University of Miami Libraries Digital Collections portal.
 Creator page for Randy Barceló in the Cuban Theater Digital Archive.
.

1946 births
1994 deaths
Costume designers
Cuban male dancers
Cuban choreographers
Cuban emigrants to the United States
Exiles of the Cuban Revolution in the United States